Abbey College may  refer to:

Abbey College, Malvern, an international  boarding  school  in  Malvern, Worcestershire, England
Abbey College, Ramsey, a comprehensive secondary school in Ramsey, Cambridgeshire,  England
Belmont Abbey College, a private liberal-arts  college in Belmont, North Carolina, USA
Colleges of the University of Otago (redirected  from Abbey College, Otago)
Newbattle Abbey (redirected from Newbattle Abbey College) a former monastery near Newbattle, Midlothian, Scotland

See also
Abbey DLD Colleges Group, UK